Isnada Lebrun (born 4 August 1997) is a Haitian footballer who plays as an attacking midfielder for French Division 2 Féminine club Stade Brestois 29 and the Haiti women's national team.

International goals
Scores and results list Haiti's goal tally first

References

External links 
 

1997 births
Living people
Women's association football midfielders
Haitian women's footballers
People from Nord-Ouest (department)
Haiti women's international footballers
Stade Brestois 29 players
Haitian expatriate footballers
Haitian expatriate sportspeople in Canada
Expatriate women's soccer players in Canada
Haitian expatriate sportspeople in France
Expatriate women's footballers in France
A.S. Blainville players